Quebec Route 211 is a provincial highway in the Canadian province of Quebec. Located in the Montérégie and Estrie regions in the southern part of the province, the highway's southern terminus is at Route 137 north of Granby and its northern terminus is at Quebec Autoroute 20 in Saint-Simon, east of Saint-Hyacinthe.

Most maps, including Google Maps and Google Earth, do not show Highway 211. However, in the most recent version of Transports Quebec's official route map, Route 211 is shown northward from Route 137 and northwestward via Rang Saint-Georges. On Google Maps, Route 211 is shown as Chemin de Saint-Valérien, Chemin de Milton and Chemin d'Upton heading north and Rang St-Georges heading northwest towards its northern terminus. It is a by-pass route towards A-20 from Granby without passing through Saint-Hyacinthe and much of Highway 137 in which it mostly runs parallel.

Municipalities along Route 211
 Sainte-Cécile-de-Milton
 St-Valérien-de-Milton
 Upton
 Saint-Liboire
 Saint-Simon

Major intersections

See also
 List of Quebec provincial highways

References

External links
 Official Transport Quebec Road Map
 Google Maps showing the corridor passed by Route 211

211